Kurundwad is a town on the banks of the Panchganga river, 55 km from Kolhapur (Kolhapur district) in the Indian state of Maharashtra.

Geography 
It is in the southern part of the Indian state of Maharashtra. It is 55 km from the district headquarters of Kolhapur and lies 2 km from the Shri Dattatrey devotee town of Narsobachi Wadi.

Kurundwad is situated near the banks of two rivers, Krishna and Panchaganga. Near Krishna river lies Kurundwad Ghat, built by Raja Raghunathrao I Dadasaheb Patwardhan around 1795. A samadhi (memorial) of Santajiraje Ghorapade, who was Commander-in-Chief of Maratha forces that humbled Aurangzeb during the reign of Chhatrapati Rajaram (1689–1700).

Transport 
The nearest railway station is in Jaysingpur, approximately 15 km to the north.

Culture 
Popular regional sports include Kabbadi, weight lifting and Kho Kho.

History 

During the British Raj, the area of Kurundwad was a native state, falling under the Deccan States Agency of the Bombay Presidency.  It formed part of the southern Mahratta jagirs.

Created in 1772 by a grant from the Peshwa, the state was later divided into two parts, including "Shedbal", which lapsed to the British government in 1857. In 1855, the remaining state area of Kurundwad was further divided into a senior branch, Kurundvad Senior, with an area of 185 miles², and a junior branch, Kurundvad Junior, with an area of 114 miles². The territory of both was widely scattered among other native states and British districts. According to the 1901 census, the senior branch had a population of 42,474, while the junior branch had a population of 34,003.

The chiefs of the branches were Brahmans by caste, belonging to the Patwardhan family. The last ruler (junior line) was Raja Shrimant Raghunathrao Ganpatrao (Dadasaheb) Patwardhan. He was ADC to the 1st President of India, recipient of the Independence Medal, recipient of King George V Silver Jubilee Medal and the King George VI Coronation Medal [Hereditary Distinction].

Legacy 
Raja Shrimant Bhalchandrarao II Chintamanrao Patwardhan, Raja of Kurundwad-Snr, ranks as a sardar in the southern Maratha country.

Demographics
The "Kurundwad Municipal Council" has population of 22,372 of which 11,325 are males while 11,047 are females as per report released by "Census India 2011".

Population of Children with age of 0-6 is 2267 which is 10.13% of total population of Kurundwad (M Cl). In Kurundwad Municipal Council, Female Sex Ratio is of 975 against state average of 929. Moreover, Child Sex Ratio in Kurundwad is around 802 compared to Maharashtra state average of 894. Literacy rate of Kurundwad city is 86.90% higher than state average of 82.34%. In Kurundwad, Male literacy is around 92.81% while female literacy rate is 80.97%.

Marathi is the official and most widely spoken language there.

Schools
 Sitabai Patwardhan High School, Kurundwad.
 Dr. Allama Iqbal High School and Junior College, Kurundwad.
 Sane Guruji Vidyalaya, Kurundwad.
 Sou. Vimaladevi Khanderao Mane Kanya Madhyamik Vidyalaya, Kurundwad.
 Prathamik Vidya Mandir, Kurundwad.
 Sanjeevani English Medium School, Kurundwad. 
Sainiki Pattern Niwasi Shala, Kurundwad.
Abhinav Prathamik Shala, Kurundwad.
Kumar Vidya Mandir No.1, Kurundwad.
Kumar Vidya Mandir No.2, Kurundwad.
Kumar Vidya Mandir No.3, Kurundwad.
Kanya Vidya Mandir No.1, Kurundwad.
Kanya Vidya Mandir No.2, Kurundwad.

Notable people
Vishnu Digambar Paluskar - Hindustani classical vocalist
Ringmaster Vishnupant  Chhatre - Circus inventor of India

See also
 Maratha
 Maratha Empire
 List of Maratha dynasties and states
 List of Indian princely states

References

External links
 Website on Kurundwad

1772 establishments in India
Cities and towns in Kolhapur district
Princely states of India
States and territories established in 1772